The Sun and the Moon is the debut studio album by English post-punk band the Sun and the Moon, featuring Mark Burgess and John Lever (both previously of the Chameleons), released in 1988 by record label Geffen.

Reception 

Trouser Press called it "a very solid LP, if no challenge to the Chameleons' general brilliance (inventive guitarists Dave Fielding and Reg Smithies are greatly missed)", while AllMusic described it as "an intelligent, gripping concept album that easily outshines [The Chameleons'] body of work".

Track listing

Personnel 

 The Sun and the Moon

 Mark Burgess – vocals, bass guitar, production, engineering, album art concept, sleeve liner notes
 Andy Clegg – guitar, production, engineering, album art concept
 John Lever – drums, percussion, production, engineering, album art concept
 Andy Whitaker – guitar, production, engineering, album art concept

 Additional personnel

 CJ – production, engineering
 Barry Diament – mastering
 Paul Cobbold – engineering
 George Marino – editing
 Jamie Maddox – sleeve photography
 Martin Kay – sleeve layout and design
 The Andrew Sisters – additional vocals

References

External links 

 

1988 debut albums
Geffen Records albums
Post-punk albums by English artists